Strictly Come Dancing returned for its seventh series on 18 September 2009 on BBC One. Bruce Forsyth and Tess Daly returned as presenters of the main show on BBC One, whilst Claudia Winkleman presented spin-off show Strictly Come Dancing: It Takes Two on BBC Two. Len Goodman, Bruno Tonioli and Craig Revel Horwood returned as judges. Series 5 winner Alesha Dixon joined the judging panel as a replacement for Arlene Phillips. Darcey Bussell (who would later become a permanent judge from 2012 until 2018) was a guest judge from the quarter final onwards.

Series 6 winner Camilla Dallerup, series 4 winner Karen Hardy and Hayley Holt were replaced as professional female dancers by Aliona Vilani, Katya Virshilas and Natalie Lowe. The show on 7 November was filmed from the Blackpool Tower Ballroom for the first time since the Grand Final of series 2. Due to illness, Forsyth did not feature in the show on 14 November. As a result, Daly took over as main presenter and Ronnie Corbett was a surprise guest. Winkleman took over Daly's normal role.

The series was won by sports presenter Chris Hollins and his professional partner Ola Jordan.

Format 
Each week since, 18 September 2009 to 19 December 2009. The couples dance a new routine (either a ballroom dance or a Latin dance) hoping to impress judges: Craig Revel Horwood, Len Goodman, Alesha Dixon and Bruno Tonioli. Each judge reviews the performance and then give a mark out of 10, giving the maximum score to 40. Once everyone has performed, they are ranked on the judges' leaderboard. So, for example if 10 couples were dancing: The highest scoring couple/joint highest scoring couple receives 10 points. The lowest scoring couple will be getting one point.

Couples 

There were 16 couples in this series.

Scoring chart

Average chart 

This table only counts for dances scored on a traditional 40-points scale (scores from the group Viennese Waltz from Week 11 are not included and the scores from Weeks 12–14 are weighted to work on the same scale as Weeks 1–11)

Highest and lowest scoring performances of the series 
The best and worst performances in each dance according to the judges' scores (out of 40) are as follows:

Couples' highest and lowest scoring dances

Weekly scores and songs 
Unless indicated othwise, individual judges scores in the charts below (given in parentheses) are listed in this order from left to right: Craig Revel Horwood, Len Goodman, Alesha Dixon, Bruno Tonioli.

Week 1 
Musical guest: Katherine Jenkins—"I Believe"

Night 1 – Ballroom 
Running order

Night 2 – Latin 
Running order

Judges' votes to save
Horwood: Martina & Matthew
Dixon: Martina & Matthew
Tonioli: Rav & Aliona
Goodman: Rav & Aliona

Week 2 
Musical guest: Jamie Cullum—"I'm All Over It"

Night 1 – Ballroom 
Running order

Night 2 – Latin 
Running order

Judges' votes to save
Horwood: Craig & Flavia
Dixon: Craig & Flavia
Tonioli: Craig & Flavia
Goodman: Did not vote, but would have voted to save Richard & Lilia.

Week 3 
Musical guest: Andy Williams—"Moon River"
Running order

Judges' votes to save
Horwood: Lynda & Darren
Dixon: Lynda & Darren
Tonioli: Lynda & Darren
Goodman: Did not vote, but would have voted to save Lynda & Darren.

Week 4 
Musical guest: Dionne Bromfield—"Mama Said" (with Amy Winehouse providing backing vocals)
Running order

Judges' votes to save
Horwood: Lynda & Darren
Dixon: Lynda & Darren
Tonioli: Craig & Flavia
Goodman: Craig & Flavia

Week 5 
Musical guest: Spandau Ballet—"Gold"
Running order

Judges' votes to save
Horwood: Zöe & James
Dixon: Zöe & James
Tonioli: Zöe & James
Goodman: Did not vote, but would have voted to save Zöe & James.

Week 6 
Musical guest: Harry Connick, Jr.—"The Way You Look Tonight"
Running order

Judges' votes to save
Horwood: Jade & Ian
Dixon: Jade & Ian
Tonioli: Jade & Ian
Goodman: Did not vote, but would have voted to save Jade & Ian.

Week 7 
Musical guest: Bee Gees—"You Should Be Dancing"
Running order

Judges' votes to save
Horwood: Ali & Brian
Dixon: Zöe & James
Tonioli: Ali & Brian
Goodman: Ali & Brian

Week 8: Blackpool Week 
Musical guest: Rod Stewart—"It's the Same Old Song"
Running order

Judges' votes to save
Horwood: Ricky G. & Erin
Dixon: Ricky G. & Erin
Tonioli: Ricky G. & Erin
Goodman: Did not vote, but would have voted to save Ricky G. & Erin.

Week 9 
Musical guest: Cast of Jersey Boys—"Beggin'"
Running order

Jade picked up an injury during dress rehearsal and was unable to perform on the live show. However, she performed it in the final when she recovered from injury.
Laila only performed half of her Rumba due to an injury backstage. The judges scored the dance just on what they saw.
Bruce Forsyth did not attend the live show due to influenza. Ronnie Corbett stepped in as guest host.

Judges' votes to save
Horwood: Ricky G. & Erin
Dixon: Phil & Katya
Tonioli: Phil & Katya
Goodman: Ricky G. & Erin

Week 10 
Musical guest: Dame Shirley Bassey—"This Time"
Running order

Jade Johnson and her partner Ian Waite had to withdraw from the competition due to a number of weeks not being able to perform due to a knee injury.

Judges' votes to save
Horwood: Laila & Anton
Dixon: Laila & Anton
Tonioli: Laila & Anton
Goodman: Did not vote, but would have voted to save Laila & Anton.

Week 11 
Musical guests: James Morrison and Nelly Furtado—"Broken Strings"
Running order

Judges' votes to save
Horwood: Ricky W. & Natalie
Dixon: Ricky W. & Natalie
Tonioli: Ricky W. & Natalie
Goodman: Did not vote, but would have voted to save Ricky W. & Natalie.

Week 12: Quarter-final 
Musical guest: Bette Midler—"The Rose"
Individual judges' scores in the chart below (given in parentheses) are listed in this order from left to right: Craig Revel Horwood, Darcey Bussell, Len Goodman, Alesha Dixon, Bruno Tonioli.

Running order

Judges' votes to save
Horwood: Ricky W. & Natalie
Bussell: Ricky W. & Natalie
Dixon: Ricky W. & Natalie
Tonioli: Did not vote, but would have voted to save Ricky W. & Natalie.
Goodman: Did not vote, but would have voted to save Ricky W. & Natalie.

Week 13: Semi-final 
Musical guest: Lily Allen—"Not Fair"
Individual judges' scores in the chart below (given in parentheses) are listed in this order from left to right: Craig Revel Horwood, Darcey Bussell, Len Goodman, Alesha Dixon, Bruno Tonioli.
Running order

Week 14: Final 
Musical guests: Alesha Dixon and Bruce Forsyth—"Something's Gotta Give"
Individual judges' scores in the charts below (given in parentheses) are listed in this order from left to right: Craig Revel Horwood, Darcey Bussell, Len Goodman, Alesha Dixon, Bruno Tonioli.
Running order (Show 1)

Running order (Show 2)

Dance chart 

 Highest scoring dance
 Lowest scoring dance
 Not performed due to injury
 Couple withdrew that week

Week 1 – Cha-Cha-Cha or Rumba, and Tango or Waltz (first group), Group Merengue (second group)
Week 2 – Cha-Cha-Cha or Rumba, and Tango or Waltz (second group), Group Merengue (first group)
Week 3 – Paso Doble or Quickstep
Week 4 – Salsa or Foxtrot
Week 5 – Jive or Viennese Waltz
Week 6 – Samba or American Smooth
Weeks 7–10 – One unlearned dance
Weeks 11 – Charleston or Rock ‘n’ Roll, and Group Viennese Waltz
Week 12 – Two unlearned dances
Week 13 – Judge's choice of dance and Argentine Tango
Week 14 – Highest-scoring ballroom, Group Lindyhop, highest-scoring Latin, Freestyle Showdance

TV ratings 
Weekly ratings for each show on BBC1. Figures exclude the BBC HD Channel. All numbers are in millions and provided by BARB

In September 2009 Strictly Come Dancing earned a place in Guinness World Records as "most successful reality television format", with licensing rights sold to broadcasters in 38 countries. Nonetheless, the sixth series' audiences had suffered as a result of direct clashes with ITV rival The X Factor. The BBC's decision in August 2009 to screen the seventh series on Saturday nights only was partly an attempt to reduce conflict with the rival talent show, as ITV had hinted that The X Factor's results show would be broadcast on Sunday evening. Sources at the BBC described the move as "better for the viewers... people at home lose out if things are competing against one another... We wanted to make Strictly Come Dancing an unmissable TV event".

However, the BBC still came under intense criticism when the extended Saturday show, initially running from 7–9pm, clashed almost entirely with The X Factor's main show. ITV sources accused the BBC of "effectively splitting the audience". Writing in The Guardian George Dixon, head of scheduling for BBC One, argued that "the ability of viewers to see programmes again, whether via personal video recorders like Sky+, online catch-up services including iPlayer or on channels such as E4 or ITV2, [makes] the notion of 'forcing' viewers to watch... outdated", adding that "There are around seven repeats of The X Factor on ITV1 and ITV2 each week".

The scheduling conflict ended with The X Factor securing a higher audience throughout the series. On 22 October 2009, the BBC rescheduled the Saturday show, now down to eight contestants, so that the overlap between the two programs was only 45 minutes. The BBC denied that the move was in direct response to the success of its ITV rival, saying instead that the move was to accommodate a new series with impressionist Jon Culshaw. Strictly Come Dancing's runtime, previously fixed at two hours, was also expected to decrease as contestants were progressively eliminated, leading to a further reduction in overlap.

Notes

References

External links 

Strictly Come Dancing series seven BBC Press Release

Season 07
2009 British television seasons